The article lists census towns in the Indian state of Andhra Pradesh. The statistical data is based on 2011 Census of India, conducted by the Office of the Registrar General and Census Commissioner, under Ministry of Home Affairs, Government of India.

Census town 

A census town is one which has urban characteristics but is not notified as a statutory town. These towns should have a minimum population of 5,000, at least 50% of male working population is employed outside the agricultural sector and minimum population density of 400 persons per km2.

Statistics 

 census of India, the state of Andhra Pradesh has a total of 104 census towns in 13 districts. Guntur district has the least with only 1. Kanuru of Krishna district is the most populated and Arempudi of East Godavari district is the least populated census towns of the state.

Notes

 Gooty and Kalyandurg of Anantapur district, Sullurpeta of Nellore district, Palakonda of Srikakulam district and Nellimarla of Vizianagaram district were upgraded as municipalities.
 Dowleswaram, Hukumpeta and Katheru of East Godavari district were merged into Rajahmundry Municipal Corporation.

List

References 

Census towns
Census towns
Lists of towns